The 2007–08 CBA season was the 13th CBA season. The season was shortened due to the 2008 Beijing Olympics, and the regular season ended in early January 2008. Guangdong Southern Tigers won the CBA title, even after the departure of Yi Jianlian for NBA.

Regular season

Xinjiang Flying Tigers finished the regular season with 26–4 in second place. Before the playoffs, it was determined that one of their players, Sou Song Cun, was not of Chinese nationality, thus violating the rule that each team may only have two foreign players. The league subsequently ruled Xinjiang loss with the score of 0–20 in all 18 matches in which Sou played, 15 of them wins originally. As a result, Xinjiang's dropped to eleventh place with 11–19, and they failed to advance to the playoffs.

Playoffs

Top 4 teams may pick their opponents of the quarterfinal round in turn by the order of their regular season standings.

Teams in bold advanced to the next round. The numbers to the left of each team indicate the team's seeding in regular season, and the numbers to the right indicate the number of games the team won in that round. Home court advantage belongs to the team with the better regular season record; teams enjoying the home advantage are shown in italics.

Notes and references

External links
Official Website 

 
Chinese Basketball Association seasons
League
CBA